The Burmese collared dove (Streptopelia xanthocycla) is a species of bird in the family Columbidae. It was formerly considered a subspecies of the Eurasian collared dove (S. decaocto).

The species occurs in China and Myanmar.

References

Burmese collared dove
Birds of Myanmar
Burmese collared dove